Margi, also known as Marghi and Marghi Central, is a Chadic language (a branch of Afroasiatic) spoken in Nigeria, Cameroon, and Chad. It is perhaps the best described of the Biu–Mandara branch of that family. Marghi South language and Putai are closely related and sometimes considered dialects of Margi.

There are several kinds of Marghi language, including Madube, Izge, Lassa, Gulak, Damboa, Mulgwai, Uba and Sukur. 

Every kind of these languages were spoken different type of the language and were from different places.

Phonology

Vowels 

Consonants 
Margi has a large consonant inventory, with a number of labialised consonants and typologically infrequent speech sounds such as a labiodental flap. Hoffmann (1963) describes 84 consonantal phonemes, a very large number compared to that of most languages. This system, with a great number of non-click consonants, compares to that of the Caucasian language Ubykh, having the largest inventory of any language without clicks. However, Hoffmann's list of consonants includes all sequences of consonant clusters occurring in onsets in the language. If labialized consonants are counted separately, there are 66 consonants that remain in the analysis, and 54 if it is interpreted as a  sequence.

The velar  may be closer to an approximant . The closely related language Bura is similar but has a palatalised lateral series as well.  is used in mimesis rather than in lexical vocabulary. The glottalised consonants  have been described as either creaky voiced or implosive; according to Maddieson, they are evidently both, as in Hausa.

The sequences that Hoffmann included in his consonant inventory are all labial–coronal:

See also
Marghi South
Marghi West

References

External links

Further reading 
Hoffmann, C. 1963. A Grammar of the Margi Language. Oxford University Press for International African Institute, London.
Maddieson, I. 1987. "The Margi vowel system and labiocoronals." Studies in African Linguistics, vol. 18, No. 3, Dec. 1987.

Biu-Mandara languages
Languages of Nigeria
Vertical vowel systems
Languages of Niger
Languages of Cameroon
Languages of Chad